Ivar Henning Mankell (3 June 1868 in Härnösand – 8 May 1930 in Stockholm) was a Swedish composer, largely of piano works. He studied at the conservatory in Stockholm from 1887 to 1895, and studied piano under Lennart Lundberg. He was a member of the Royal Swedish Academy of Music, and wrote music criticism for the Svenska morgonbladet and the Stockholms-tidningen. He gave private lessons in piano and music theory. He is also the grandson of Johan Hermann Mankell, the son of painter Emil Theodor Mankell, and the grandfather of author Henning Mankell.

His compositions are primarily pieces for solo piano and for chamber ensembles including piano. He was influenced by French Impressionism.

References
Layton/Rabes, "Henning Mankell". The New Grove Dictionary of Music and Musicians. London: Macmillan, 2001.

External links

1868 births
1930 deaths
19th-century classical composers
20th-century classical composers
Members of the Royal Swedish Academy of Music
People from Härnösand
Romantic composers
Swedish classical composers
Swedish male classical composers
20th-century Swedish male musicians
20th-century Swedish musicians
19th-century male musicians